On January 31, 2001, Japan Airlines Flight 907, a Boeing 747-400 en route from Haneda Airport, Japan, to Naha Airport, Okinawa, narrowly avoided a mid-air collision with Japan Airlines Flight 958, a McDonnell Douglas DC-10-40 en route from Gimhae International Airport, South Korea, to Narita International Airport, Japan. The event became known in Japan as the {{nihongo|Japan Airlines near miss incident above Suruga Bay |日本航空機駿河湾上空ニアミス事故|Nihonkōkūki surugawan jōkū niamisu jiko}}. Had the accident occurred, it could've potentially been either the worst mid-air collision (beating the 1996 Charkhi Dadri mid-air collision with 346 fatalities), to the worst air disaster of all time (beating the Tenerife airport disaster with 583 fatalities).

The incident was attributed to errors made by Air Traffic Controller (ATC) trainee  and trainee supervisor . The incident caused Japanese authorities to call upon the International Civil Aviation Organization (ICAO) to take measures to prevent similar incidents from occurring.

Flight information
The Boeing 747-446 Domestic, registration JA8904, was operating Flight 907 from Tokyo Haneda International Airport to Naha Airport with 411 passengers and 16 crew. The flight departed Haneda airport at 15:36 local time. Flight 907 was commanded by 40-year-old pilot .

The McDonnell Douglas DC-10-40, registration JA8546, was operating Flight 958 from Gimhae International Airport to Narita International Airport with 237 passengers and 13 crew. Flight 958 was commanded by 45-year-old pilot .

Mid-air incident
The mid-air incident occurred as flight attendants began to serve drinks onboard Flight 907. JA8904's 'Traffic Collision Avoidance System (TCAS)' sounded 20 minutes after its departure as the jet climbed towards . The TCAS on both aircraft functioned correctly, a "CLIMB" instruction was annunciated for Flight 907; however, the flight crew received contradicting instructions from the flight controller at the Tokyo Area Control Center in Tokorozawa, Saitama Prefecture. Flight 907 followed an order to descend issued by the flight controller while Flight 958 descended as instructed by the TCAS, meaning that the planes remained on a collision course.

The trainee for the aerospace sector, 26-year-old , handled ten other flights at the time of the near miss. Hachitani intended to tell Flight 958 to descend. Instead, at 15:54, he told Flight 907 to descend. When the trainee noticed that JAL 958 cruised at a level altitude instead of descending, the trainee asked JAL 958 to turn right; the message did not get through to the JAL 958 pilot. The trainee's supervisor, ordered "JAL 957" to climb, intending to tell JAL 907 to climb. There was not a JAL flight 957 in the sky at the moment of the incident, but it can be inferred that by "957" she meant flight 907.

An unidentified passenger told NHK, "I have never seen a plane fly so close. I thought we were going to crash." Alex Turner, a passenger on Flight 907 and a student at Kadena High School, estimated that the avoidance maneuver lasted for two seconds.

Seven passengers and two crew members of the 747 sustained serious injuries; additionally, 81 passengers and 10 crew members reported minor injuries. Some unbelted passengers, flight attendants, and drink carts hit the ceiling, dislodging some ceiling tiles. The maneuver threw one boy across four rows of seats. Most of the injuries to occupants consisted of bruising. The maneuvers broke the leg of a 54-year-old woman. In addition, a drink cart spilled, scalding some passengers. No passengers on the DC-10 sustained injuries. Flight 907, with the 747's cabin bearing minor damage, returned to Haneda, landing at 16:45.

Aftermath

By 18:00 on February 1, eight Flight 907 passengers remained hospitalized, while 22 injured passengers had been released. All injured passengers recovered.

JAL sent apology letters to the passengers on the 747; injured passengers directly received messages, and uninjured passengers received messages via the mail.

In its report on the accident, published in July 2002, the Aircraft and Railway Accidents Investigation Commission called on the International Civil Aviation Organization (ICAO) to make it clear that TCAS advisories should always take precedence over ATC instructions. A similar recommendation was made three months later by Germany's accident investigation body (the BFU) in light of the Überlingen mid-air collision. ICAO accepted these recommendations and amended its regulations in November 2003.

Flight numbers 907 and 958 are still used by Japan Airlines for the same respective routes today, but are operated with an Airbus A350 and Boeing 737, respectively.

Criminal investigation and trial
The Tokyo Metropolitan Police Department and Ministry of Land, Infrastructure and Transport investigated the incident.

In May 2003, Tokyo police filed an investigative report concerning Hideki Hachitani (ATC trainee), Yasuko Momii (ATC Supervisor), and Makoto Watanabe (pilot of flight 907), suspecting them of professional negligence. In March 2004, prosecutors indicted Hachitani and Momii for professional negligence.

Hachitani, then 30 years old, and Momii, then 35 years old, pleaded not guilty to the charges at Tokyo District Court in 2004. During the same year, the lawyer for Hachitani and Momii said that the pilots of the aircraft bore the responsibility for the near miss.

By November 16, 2005, 12 trials had been held since the initial hearing on September 9, 2004. The prosecution argued that the two defendants neglected to provide proper separation for the two aircraft, the instructions issued were inappropriate, and that the supervisor failed to correct the trainee. The defense argued that the lack of separation would not immediately have led to a near miss, that the instructions issued were appropriate, that the TCAS procedure was not proper, and that the Computer Navigation Fix (CNF) had faulty data.

In 2006, prosecutors asked for Hachitani, then 31, to be sentenced to ten years in prison and for Momii, then 37, to be sentenced to 15 years in prison. On March 20, 2006, the court ruled that Hachitani and Momii were not guilty of the charge. The court stated that Hachitani could not have foreseen the accident and that the mixup of the flight numbers did not have a causal relationship with the accident. Hisaharu Yasui, the presiding judge, said that prosecuting controllers and pilots would be "unsuitable" in this case. The Tokyo District Public Prosecutor's Office filed an appeal with the Tokyo High Court on March 31. During the same year, the Japanese government agreed to pay Japan Airlines and Tokio Marine & Nichido Fire Insurance a total of ¥82.4 million to compensate for the near miss (equivalent to ¥ million in ).

On April 11, 2008, on appeal, a higher court overturned the decision and found Hachitani and Momii guilty. The presiding judge, sentenced Hachitani, then 33, to 12 months imprisonment, and Momii, then 39, to 18 months imprisonment, with both sentences suspended for 3 years. The lawyers representing the controllers appealed, but the convictions were upheld on October 26, 2010, by the Supreme Court.

In popular culture
The events of the incident are documented in the final season 3 episode of the Discovery Channel documentary Aircrash Confidential. The episode was first aired on 20 August 2018.

It was also briefly mentioned in the Air Crash Investigation (also known as Mayday in other countries) episode, "Deadly Crossroads".

See also

 Überlingen mid-air collision, mid-air collision in 2002 also attributed to conflicting ATC and TCAS messages
 1996 Charkhi Dadri mid-air collision

Notes

References

External links
 Aircraft and Railway Accidents Investigation Commission
 Aircraft Accident Investigation Report (Archive)
  Aircraft Accident Investigation Report (Archive)
 Ministry of Land, Infrastructure and Transport
 "日本航空９０７便事故に係る書類送検に関する航空局長コメント." May 7, 2003 (15th year of Heisei). (Archive)
 "日本航空９０７便事故に係る民事調停成立に関する　航空局長コメントについて." March 31, 2006 (18th year of Heisei) (Archive)
 Japan Airlines
 TOKYO: JANUARY 31, 2001 - FLIGHT JL907 INCIDENT (Archive)
 JANUARY 31 NEAR MISS - STATUS REPORT FEBRUARY 1 2001 (Archive)
 JL907/JL958 NEAR MISS - CAPTAINS' REPORTS FEB 1 2001 (Archive)
 JL907 (Japanese) - Contains a list of passengers injured on Japan Airlines Flight 907 (Japanese) (Archive)
 The German Midair – Lessons to be Learned
 Close Call For JAL Jets  CBS News
 Japan Jet in Mid-Air Near-Miss ABC News
 A REVIEW OF JAL907/JAL958 NEAR MID-AIR COLLISION.
 ９０７便、回避後降下で被害拡大 Mainichi Shimbun

Aviation accidents and incidents caused by air traffic controller error
Aviation accidents and incidents in Japan
Accidents and incidents involving the Boeing 747
Accidents and incidents involving the McDonnell Douglas DC-10
Aviation accidents and incidents in 2001
2001 in Japan
Japan Airlines accidents and incidents
January 2001 events in Japan